Francisco "Paco" González (born 16 June 1951) is a Paraguayan former professional footballer who played as a midfielder.

Playing career
González started appearing professionally for Belenenses in 1972, scoring sixteen goals in twenty-six matches throughout the 1972–73 Primeira Divisão season; notably netting twice on his debut against CUF Barreiro on 10 September. He remained with the club for a total of five campaigns, with fifty-eight goals coming across one hundred and twenty-nine matches; though none were scored in his final season of 1976–77. Prior to the start of the 1977–78 Primeira Divisão, González joined Porto. Despite staying for two years, he appeared just six times for them without finding the net. González rejoined Belenenses in 1979, before joining Atlético in 1981.

Coaching career
In 1989, González was second assistant manager to Marinho Peres at Belenenses as they won the Taça de Portugal.

Career statistics

Honours
Porto
Primeira Divisão: 1977–78, 1978–79

References

External links

1951 births
Living people
People from Itauguá
Paraguayan footballers
Association football midfielders
Paraguayan expatriate footballers
Expatriate footballers in Portugal
Paraguayan expatriate sportspeople in Portugal
Primeira Liga players
C.F. Os Belenenses players
FC Porto players
Atlético Clube de Portugal players